Claude-Etienne Minié (13 February 1804 – 14 December 1879) was a French military instructor and inventor famous for solving the problem of designing a reliable muzzle-loading rifle by inventing the Minié ball in 1846, and the Minié rifle in 1849. He succeeded the pioneering work of Henri-Gustave Delvigne and Louis-Étienne de Thouvenin.

Minié served in a number of African campaigns with the Chasseurs, after which he was eventually promoted to captain.  In 1846 he designed the Minié ball, a cylindrical bullet with a conical hollow in the base which expanded when fired.  This projectile, combined with his rifle, resulted in a major improvement in firearm accuracy.

The English government rewarded Minié with some 20,000 francs and installed him as a member of the staff at the Vincennes military school. In 1858 he retired from the Imperial Russian Army with the rank of colonel and later served as a military instructor for the khedive of Egypt and as a manager at the Remington Arms Company in the United States. His rifling technology proved critical to the increase in firearms accuracy seen during the American Civil War.

References
Sifakis, Stewart; « Minie, Claude Etienne. » in Who was who in the Civil War. 
Encyclopædia Britannica article on Claude Etienne Minie

1804 births
1879 deaths
Firearm designers
19th-century French inventors
French Army officers
Gunsmiths